Ivailo Marinov (born 13 July 1960 in Varna, also known as Ismail Mustafov, Ismail Huseinov or Ivailo Khristov) is a Bulgarian boxer of Muslim Romani ancestry, who won the bronze medal at the 1980 Summer Olympics in light flyweight, and the gold medal in the same category at the 1988 Summer Olympics

Amateur career
Besides his Olympics results, Marinov also won the gold medal at the World Championship in 1982.

Marinov also won four gold medals in the European Boxing Championships in 1981, 1983, 1989 and 1991 and a silver medal in 1985.

1980 Olympic results
Below is the record of Ivailo Marinov, a Bulgarian light flyweight boxer who competed at the 1980 Moscow Olympics:

Round of 32: bye
Round of 16: Defeated Gerard Hawkins (Ireland) by decision, 5-0
Quarterfinal: Defeated Ahmed Siad (Algeria) by decision, 5-0
Semifinal: Lost to Hipolito Ramos (Cuba) by decision, 1-4 (was awarded bronze medal)

1988 Olympic results
Below is the record of Ivailo Marinov, a Bulgarian light flyweight boxer who competed at the 1988 Seoul, Olympics:

Round of 64: bye
Round of 32: Defeated Mark Epton (Great Britain) by decision, 5-0
Round of 16: Defeated Henry Martínez (El Salvador) by decision, 5-0
Quarterfinal: Defeated Alexander Mahmutov (Soviet Union) by decision, 5-0
Semifinal: Defeated Leopoldo Serantes (Philippines) by decision, 5-0
Final: Defeated Michael Carbajal (United States) by decision, 5-0 (won gold medal)

Honors
He was picked as Bulgaria's No. 1 Boxer of the 20th Century in a survey conducted by the Bulgarian Association of Boxing Journalists.

References

External links
 Bulgarian Olympic Committee profile

1960 births
Living people
Bulgarian Muslims
Olympic boxers of Bulgaria
Boxers at the 1980 Summer Olympics
Boxers at the 1988 Summer Olympics
Bulgarian people of Turkish descent
Olympic gold medalists for Bulgaria
Olympic bronze medalists for Bulgaria
Sportspeople from Varna, Bulgaria
Olympic medalists in boxing
Bulgarian male boxers
AIBA World Boxing Championships medalists
Medalists at the 1988 Summer Olympics
Medalists at the 1980 Summer Olympics
Light-flyweight boxers
Bulgarian people of Romani descent